Om Prakash Sharma (born 14 December 1932) is an Indian painter, visual artist, professor, writer and sitarist based in New Delhi, India. He was bestowed with National Award for Painting of Lalit Kala Akademi in 1969, by the President of India. Sharma has won All India Fine Arts and Crafts Society's  Annual Art Exhibitions thrice in 1966, 1967 and 1969, and has been awarded with multiple awards at various state exhibitions.

Early life and education
Sharma was born in 1932, in Bawal, Haryana. He attended Meerut College where he graduated in drawing and paintings in 1951. Sharma earned The National Diploma in Fine Arts in 1958 from Delhi Polytechnic with First Class and Distinction. From 1964 to 1966, Sharma attended Columbia University and Art Students League of New York as a Fulbright scholar where he completed his postgraduate studies in Fine Arts and Art History.

Career

Art educator
After completing his graduation in 1951, Sharma joined D.A.V. School, Paharganj, New Delhi, as an art teacher, where he worked for five years. In 1956, Sharma was appointed as senior art teacher at Government Model School, Ludlow Castle, Delhi where he worked till 1961. From 1961 to 1981, Sharma served as the head of the art department at School of Planning and Architecture, Delhi. In 1981, Sharma was appointed as the Dean at College of Art, Delhi where he served till 1992.

Artist
Om Prakash Sharma's career as an artist spans over six decades. His work as an artist has been centered around New Delhi. Sharma is known primarily as a practitioner of a uniquely Indian visual style. Sharma started his career as an artist in 1956 during annual exhibition at All India Fine Arts and Crafts Society in Delhi. His paintings has been exhibited at over 100 solo and group exhibition. His art works has been part of permanent collections at various art galleries and museums including Berlin Museum, Academy of Fine Arts Museum, Moscow and Darat al Funun, Amman, Jordan. He is regarded as the one of the founders of the Neo-Tantra art movement.

Sharma started playing sitar in 1956 when he came in contact with Pandit Ravi Shankar, who helped him in identifying the traditional iconography of different ragas which inspired him to paint 25 Ragmala paintings in water colors. Influence of music has always inspired visual rhythms of Sharma's work.
Sharma has written about art in several art magazines and art columns. He has been an invited keynote speaker at various public talks organized by art societies, museums and institutions in India and abroad, on his paintings in context of contemporary art and the tradition of tantra art. He had also held positionof advisor to various art committees such Boards of education, Parliament House Complex, HUDCO, Urban Arts Commission and several University Counsels. Sharma has also authored several books including Art in Art in 1994, Om Prakash - Forty Years 1958 - 1998 in 1999 and Om Prakash- Sixty Years 1951 - 2012 in 2013.

Sharma has received several awards, including three first prizes in Annual Art Exhibitions of the AIFACS, New Delhi. He was awarded the National Award for Painting of Lalit Kala Akademi in 1969. He was also awarded the Delhi State Award from the Chief Minister of Delhi in 2003. He holds Honorary membership of Russian Academy of Arts, Moscow. In 2008, Sharma received Life Time Achievement Award from ART MALL, New Delhi.

Awards and accolades
 1966- First prize at All India Fine Arts and Crafts Society's  Annual Art Exhibitions
 1967- First prize at All India Fine Arts and Crafts Society's Annual Art Exhibitions
 1969- First prize at All India Fine Arts and Crafts Society's Annual Art Exhibitions
 1969 - National Award for Painting of Lalit Kala Akademi.
 2003 - Delhi State Award from the Chief Minister of Delhi.
 Honorary membership of Russian Academy of Arts, Moscow.
 Lifetime Achievement Award by ART MALL, New Delhi in 2008

Solo exhibitions

 1958 - Hotel Rex, Delhi
 1959 - AIFACS, New Delhi
 1959 - AIFACS, New Delhi
 1961 - AIFACS, New Delhi
 1963 - AIFACS, New Delhi
 1963 - Ashoka Gallery, Calcutta
 1964 - Kumar Gallery, New Delhi
 1965 - Artistica Gallery, Long Island, USA
 1965 - Duncan Gallery, New York City, USA
 1967 - Kumar Gallery, New Delhi
 1968 - Kumar Gallery, New Delhi
 1969 - Kumar Gallery, New Delhi
 1970 - Kumar Gallery, New Delhi
 1971 - Gallery Chanakya, New Delhi
 1972 - Gallery Chanakya, New Delhi
 1973 - Fair Field University Gallery, Connecticut USA
 1973 - St. John the Divine Gallery, New York, USA
 1974 - Gallery Chanakya, New Delhi
 1975 - Gallery Chanakya, New Delhi

 1975 - Pundole Art Gallery, Mumbai
 1976 - Solar Gallery, New York, USA
 1977 - Kumar Gallery, New Delhi
 1978 - Pundole Art Gallery, Mumbai
 1980 - Lalit Kala Gallery, New Delhi
 1981 - Ancient Currents Gallery, San Francisco, USA
 1985 - Dhoomimal Art Gallery, New Delhi
 1986 - Gallery Chemould, Mumbai
 1988 - Gallery Aurobindo, New Delhi
 1988 - Shridharani Gallery, New Delhi
 1989 - Asia & Pacific Museum, Warsaw, Poland
 1989 - Sian Gallery, Pusan, South Korea
 1990 - Shridharani Gallery, New Delhi
 1990 - International Friendship House, Moscow and Riga
 1991 - Shridharani Gallery, New Delhi
 1991 - World Wide Gallery, New York, USA
 1991 - Gallery Roman Rolland, New Delhi
 1992 - Hotel Hyatt Regency, New Delhi
 1994 - LTG Gallery, New Delhi

 1994 - World Wide Gallery, New York, USA
 1995 - Aurobindo Gallery, New Delhi
 1996 - LTG Gallery, New Delhi
 1998 - LTG Gallery, New Delhi
 1998 - Indian High Commission, Port Louis, Mauritius
 1999 - Max Mueller Bhavan, New Delhi
 1999 - Shoman Foundation, Amman, Jordan
 1999 - St. Raphael Gallery, London, England
 2000 - Honjo Gallery, Tokyo, Japan
 2001 - Gallery Zen, Bangalore, India
 2002 - S. Art Gallery, Moscow, Russia
 2003 - The Grand Hotel, New Delhi
 2003 - Pioneer Gallery, New Delhi
 2005 - Visual Art Gallery, Indian Habitat Center, New Delhi
 2006 - Embassy of Slovak Republic, New Delhi
 2007 - Lalit Kala Akademi, New Delhi
 2012 - Alliance Francaise, New Delhi
 2013 - Lalit Kala Akademi, New Delhi
 2016-17 - Marin County Foundation, Novada, San Francisco, USA

Group exhibitions

 1956 to 1969 - AIFACS, New Delhi, Annual Exhibitions.
 1961 - A.I.R, New Delhi, Exhibition on Theme of Music
 1963 - Three Painters Inaugural Show, Chemould Gallery, Mumbai
 1963 - Exhibition for National Defence Fund, L.K.A., New Delhi
 1963 to 1975 - Annual National Exhibitions, L.K.A., New Delhi
 1966 - Flowers and Flowering Trees, AIFACS, New Delhi
 1967 - Seven Artists, Kumar Gallery, New Delhi
 1968, 1969, 1992 - Sahitya Kala Parishad, Delhi
 1970 - Art Today by Kunika Chemould, New Delhi
 1972 - Avant-Garde Indian Paintings, Kumar Gallery, New Delhi
 1972 - Inaugural Group Show, Chanakya Gallery, Akbar Hotel, New Delhi
 1973 - Twenty Five Years of Indian Art, New Delhi
 1973 - International Playgroup's Annual Exhibition, IBM, New York, USA
 1977 - AIFACS, Golden Jubilee International Exhibition, New Delhi
 1980 - Miniature Format Paintings, L.K.A., New Delhi
 1983 - Second Asian Art Biennale, Bangladesh
 1983 - 84 - 'Tantra' Exhibition, India Festival West German Museums

 1984 - 15th International Exhibition, Japan.
 1985 - 'Neo - Tantra' Art Exhibition, New South Wales, Australia
 1987 - Indian Art Exhibition for International Book Fair, Frankfurt, Germany
 1987 - Indian Festival, Moscow, USSR
 1988 - Exhibition of CRY, Metro Cities of India
 1989 - Art Teachers Exhibition, HABIART, New Delhi
 1990 - 50 Artists by Gallery Chanakya at L.K.A., New Delhi
 1990 - Ambassador's Choice at NGMA, New Delhi
 1991 - Changing Images, Jahangir Art Gallery, Mumbai
 1991 - Award Winner's National Exhibition of Art, L.K.A., New Delhi
 1991 - Connoisseur's Choice at Habiart, New Delhi
 1994 - Spiritual and Cultural Exchange Exhibition, AIFACS, New Delhi.
 1995 - A Homage to Gandhi, LTG Gallery, New Delhi
 1997 - Magnetic Forms at Art Konsult, New Delhi
 1998 - Symbolism and Geometry in Indian Art, NGMA, New Delhi
 2005 - Christies Auction, New York, U.S.A
 2006 - Triveda Auction, New Delhi

 2006 - Harmony Show, Mumbai
 2006 - Pioneer Gallery, New Delhi
 2006 - Suruchi Art Gallery, New Delhi
 2006 - Colours - Artland, Mumbai
 2007- Bonhams Auction, London
 2007- Red Earth, Monsoon Show, New Delhi
 2007- Osians Auction, New Delhi
 2007- 60th Milestone, New Delhi
 2007- Rainbow In the Sun, L.K.A, New Delhi
 2007- Tales of Textures, Art Elements Gallery, New Delhi
 2007- Art for Prabhat, New Delhi
 2007 - Convergence, Trident Hilton, Gurgaon
 2007- D.M.G 70th Anniversary Show L.K.A, New Delhi
 2008- Art for Aged, Auction, Oberoi Hotel, New Delhi
 2010 - Haryana Art Academy, L.K.A. New Delhi
 2014 - India Art Fair, New Delhi
 2015 - Spiritual Art Exhibition of Museum of Sacred Art, Belgium at Lalit Kala Akademi, New Delhi
 2016 - Spiritual Art by MOSA at Lalit Kala Academi, New Delhi

References

External links

Living people
People from Rewari district
1932 births
20th-century Indian painters
Painters from Haryana
Columbia University alumni